The year 1968 in television involved some significant events.
Below is a list of television-related events in 1968.

Events
January 20 – Houston defeats UCLA 71–69 at the Houston Astrodome on the TVS Television Network in what is billed as "The Game of the Century"; the first prime-time national broadcast of men's college basketball.
January 27 – The Lennon Sisters make their final appearance on The Lawrence Welk Show on ABC (United States).
January 31 – Turkey's first national TV channel TRT 1 is opened.
February 6 – The Xth Olympic Winter Games in Grenoble, France are the first Olympics to be fully broadcast in color for the U.S. market by ABC. 
April 2
NBC in the US broadcasts a television special in which British singer Petula Clark appears with Harry Belafonte as her guest. An innocent, affectionate gesture between the two during a song (Clark touches Belafonte on the arm) has prompted concern from the show's sponsor (Chrysler Corporation) due to the difference in their races.
RAI in Italy broadcasts the first episode of the miniseries La famiglia Benvenuti (The Benvenuti family), by Alfredo Giannetti, with Enrico Maria Salerno and Valeria Valeri, about the life of the Italian middle class. The show, innovative at this time, is received well by the public and critics alike, and the child actor Giusva Fioravanti (later infamous right-wing terrorist) becomes a star.
April 4 – Singer James Brown appears on national television in an attempt to calm feelings of anger in the United States following the assassination of Reverend Doctor Martin Luther King Jr.
April 6 – The Eurovision Song Contest 1968 is held at the Royal Albert Hall in London, the first to be televised in colour.
April 27 – Jordan Television, as predecessor of Jordan Radio and Television Corporation (JRTV-One), a first official television broadcasting service start in Jordan, is launched in Amman. 
May 2 –  The Israel Broadcasting Authority commences television broadcasts.
May 4 – Mary Hopkin performs on the British TV talent show Opportunity Knocks. Hopkin catches the attention of model Twiggy, who recommends her to Beatle Paul McCartney. McCartney soon signs Hopkin to Apple Records.
May 20 – Harlech (which will become HTV in 1970) starts its dual service for Wales and the West Country in the UK, replacing the interim ITSWW, which had replaced TWW.
 August 20–21 – Warsaw Pact invasion of Czechoslovakia. Events are televised live across Europe.
 June 2 – The first cricket match to be televised in colour by the BBC, Surrey v International Cavaliers held at Cheam Cricket Club Ground. The game attracts 8,000 people.
October 13 – Actress Bea Benaderet of the popular CBS-TV sitcom Petticoat Junction dies of lung cancer at the age of 62 shortly after the start of the popular program's sixth season. 
October 14 – First live television broadcast from a spacecraft in orbit, during the Apollo 7 mission. There are six broadcasts during the eleven-day mission.
October 21–25 – Joan Crawford makes a guest appearance for five episodes on the soap opera The Secret Storm, filling in for her ailing daughter, Christina. Joan slurs her lines and appears to be intoxicated during the tapings.
November 17 – NBC breaks away from a pro football game to air a TV movie adaptation of Heidi, sparking furious protest. After the break away, the Oakland Raiders score two touchdowns to defeat the New York Jets, in the final minute of play.
November 17 - WABC-TV debutes the Eyewitness News format on behalf of news director Al Primo.
November 22 – William Shatner and Nichelle Nichols share the first interracial kiss on US television in the Star Trek episode "Plato's Stepchildren".
December 3 – The 50-minute television special Elvis (sponsored by sewing machine manufacturer The Singer Company), taped in June with a live audience in Burbank, California, airs on NBC in the United States marking the comeback of Elvis Presley after 7 years during which the legendary rock and roll musician's career has centered on the movie industry. Concluding with the premiere of "If I Can Dream", it is not only the highest rated television show for the week of broadcast, but the highest rated television special of the year. Its original broadcast is followed by a Brigitte Bardot special.   
December 24 – Apollo 8 broadcasts to the Earth, relaying a report that there is a Santa Claus and reading a passage from the Book of Genesis.
Also in 1968
Nearly 200 million households now own television sets, 78 million of which are in the US.
Rosemary Prinz, one of the first big soap opera stars, leaves As the World Turns in a less-than-amicable departure.
The Guiding Light and Search for Tomorrow expand to 30 minutes.
The last round-screen color TV sets are produced by all American manufacturers.

Programs/programmes
American Bandstand (1952–1989)
Another World (1964–1999)
As the World Turns (1956–2010)
Bewitched (1964–1972)
Blue Peter (UK) (1958–present)
Bonanza (1959–1973)
Bozo the Clown (1949–present)
Candid Camera (1948–present)
Captain Kangaroo (1955–1984)
Come Dancing (UK) (1949–1995)
Coronation Street (UK) (1960–present)
Crossroads (UK) (1964–1988, 2001–2003)
Daniel Boone (1964–1970)
Dark Shadows (1966–1971)
Days of Our Lives (1965–present)
Dixon of Dock Green (UK) (1955–1976)
Do Not Adjust Your Set (1967–1969)
Doctor Who (UK) (1963–1989, 1996, 2005–present)
Face the Nation (1954–present)
Family Affair (1966–1971)
Four Corners (Australia) (1961–present)
General Hospital (1963–present)
Get Smart (1965–1970)
Gomer Pyle, U.S.M.C. (1964–1970)
Grandstand (UK) (1958–2007)
Green Acres (1965–1971)
Gunsmoke (1955–1975)
Hallmark Hall of Fame (1951–present)
Here's Lucy (1968–1974)
Hogan's Heroes (1965–1971)
I Dream of Jeannie (1965–1970)
Ironside (1967–1975)
I Spy (1965-1968)
It's Academic (1961–present)
Jeopardy! (1964–1975, 1984–present)
Love is a Many Splendored Thing (1967–1973)
Love of Life (1951–1980)
Mannix (1967–1975)
Match Game (1962–1969, 1973–1984, 1990–1991, 1998–1999)
Meet the Press (1947–present)
Mission: Impossible (1966–1973)
My Three Sons (1960–1972)
Opportunity Knocks (UK) (1956–1978)
Panorama (UK) (1953–present)
Petticoat Junction (1963–1970)
Peyton Place (1964–1969)
Play School (1966–present)
Search for Tomorrow (1951–1986)
Spider-Man (1967–1970)
Star Trek (1966–1969)
That Girl (1966–1971)
The Andy Griffith Show (1960–1968, direct spinoff Mayberry RFD premiered on September 23, and ran until 1971)
The Avengers (UK) (1961–1969)
The Beverly Hillbillies (1962–1971)
The Carol Burnett Show (1967–1978)
The Dean Martin Show (1965–1974)
The Doctors (1963–1982)
The Ed Sullivan Show (1948–1971)
The Edge of Night (1956–1984)
The Flying Nun (1967–1970)
The Good Old Days (UK) (1953–1983)
The Guiding Light (1952–2009)
The Hollywood Palace (1964–1970)
The Late Late Show (Ireland) (1962–present)
The Lawrence Welk Show (1955–1982)
The Lucy Show (1962–1968)
The Mike Douglas Show (1961–1981)
The Money Programme (UK) (1966–present)
The Mothers-in-Law (1967–1969)
The Newlywed Game (1966–1974)
The Saint (UK) (1962–1969)
The Secret Storm (1954–1974)
The Sky at Night (UK) (1957–present)
The Smothers Brothers Comedy Hour (1967–1969)
The Today Show (1952–present)
The Tonight Show Starring Johnny Carson (1962–1992)
The Wednesday Play (UK) (1964–1970)
This Is Your Life (UK) (1955–2003)
Tom and Jerry (1965–1972, 1975–1977, 1980–1982)
Top of the Pops (UK) (1964–2006)
Truth or Consequences (1950–1988)
 TRT 1 Foreign films day (Turkey) (1968–present)
 TRT 1 Turkish films day (Turkey) (1968–present)
Walt Disney's Wonderful World of Color (1961 – July 1971)
What the Papers Say (UK) (1956–present)
World of Sport (UK) (1965–1985)
Z-Cars (UK) (1962–1978)

Debuts
January 1 – Vremya (Вре́мя, "Time") in the Soviet Union (1964–1991, 1994–present)
January 5 – Gardeners' World on BBC1 in the UK (1968–present)
January 22 – Rowan & Martin's Laugh-In on NBC (1968–1973)
February 19 – National Educational Television begins airing Mister Rogers' Neighborhood
April – Audubon Wildlife Theatre on CBC (1968–1974)
May 18 – The Prisoner has its U.S. premiere on CBS
July 5 – The Expert on BBC2 in the UK (1968–1976)
July 15 – One Life to Live (created by Agnes Nixon) on ABC (1968–2012, 2013–present)
July 30 – Magpie on ITV in the UK (1968–1980)
July 31 – Popular sitcom Dad's Army run on BBC1 in the UK (1968–1977)
September – What's My Line in first-run syndication (1968–1975)
September 14 
The Archie Show on CBS Saturday Morning (1968–1969)
The Bugs Bunny/Road Runner Hour and on CBS Saturday Morning (1968–1971; 1975–1985; known as The Bugs Bunny/Road Runner Show from 1978 to 1985) 
Wacky Races on CBS Saturday Morning (1968-1969)
September 17 – Julia on NBC (1968–1971)
September 21 – Adam-12 on NBC (1968–1975)
September 22 – Land of the Giants on ABC (1968–1970)
September 23
Here's Lucy on CBS (1968–1974)
Mayberry R.F.D. on CBS (1968–1971)
September 24
The Doris Day Show on CBS (1968–1973)
The Mod Squad on ABC (1968–1973)
60 Minutes (1968–present) on CBS
September 25 – Here Come the Brides on ABC (1968–1970)
September 26 – Hawaii Five-O on CBS (1968–1980)
September 29 – Fabeltjeskrant on NOS (1968–1989)

Ending this year

Births

Deaths

See also
 1968–69 United States network television schedule

References